Yongsan Electronics Market is a retail area in Seoul, South Korea. Comprising over 20 buildings, housing 5,000 stores that sell appliances, stereos, computers and peripherals, office equipment, telephones, lighting equipment, electronic games and software, videos and CD's.  A variety of electronic components for constructing computers and other items can also be found. Korean-made products generally cost 20% less here than other retail outlets, while imported items can be as much as 50% cheaper.

The market has a variety of stores, each with different operating procedures.  Some stores operate like traditional retail shops, with set prices, name brands, and warranties.  Other shops accept, or even expect, customers to bargain and may not have any posted prices for items.

The Composition of Electronics Market

Wonhyo Electronic Market 
Located in the western part of Yongsan Electronics Market, it mainly handles electricity and lighting equipment.

Yongsan ETLand 
It is a large shopping mall located in the western part of Yongsan Electronics Electronics Market, and it handles products like electronic devices, home appliances and computers. On the fourth and fifth floors, Lotte Cinema Yongsan Hall (formerly Land Cinema), a multiplex, is located, and on the fifth floor there is a store selling Gundam-related goods.

Najin Mall 
Located in the central part of Yongsan Electronics Electronics Market. The handling items depend on the district, while 12 and 13 districts handle electronic devices such as mobile phones and game consoles, while 17-20 districts mainly handle computers and their peripherals.

Sunin Plaza 
It is located in the southern part of Yongsan Electronics Shopping Center. It handles computers and their peripherals.

It also deals with parts needed for upgrading and exchanging computer hardware parts.

Terminal Market 
It was a shopping mall connected to Yongsan Station on Subway Line 1 in the Seoul metropolitan area, but it was all demolished around May 2014. The existing passageways are kept accessible by installing elevators and stairs at the end.

After the demolition, the Yongsan Tourist Hotel began construction in 2014, and in June 2017, the largest Yongsan Tourism Hotel in Korea was completed and connected to Yongsan Station.

Location and Hours 
The Electronics Market is located on Subway line 1, at Yongsan Station.  Entrance is from the train station through the Terminal Shopping Center or by walking around the station at ground level to enter the market.  It may also be reached by the subway line to Sinyongsan station.  The major stores are open from 10:00 am to 8:00 pm, while many smaller stores keep a variety of hours.  Most stores in the area are closed on the 1st and 3rd Sunday of every month. The department stores and many shops in Seoul are closed on alternating Sundays (twice a month).
There is an outdoor flea market in the area on the first and third Sunday of the month, when things are even cheaper. The shops open around 11 AM.

Touting
A great deal of shops are in competition and merchants usually try to let you test out the product. From such conducts, Netizens coined new word, Yong pali, meaning Salesperson in Yongsan to criticize their shameless sale behavior. It has been pointed out that this is one of the reasons consumers worry about visiting the market. Due to this publicity, The President of the Hyundai I shopping mall has announced that it seeks to improve such misconduct and offer improved customer service.  It is recommended to use English-speaking stores and compare each seller.

See also
List of markets in South Korea
List of South Korean tourist attractions

External links

 www.IParkMall.co.kr - Large shopping mall attached to Yongsan Station (but not the only shopping mall in this area)
  - Article about shopping at Electroland, Space9, and other stores/areas in the Yongsan district

References

Yongsan District
Retail markets in Seoul
Electronics districts